The canton of Provins is a French administrative division, located in the arrondissement of Provins, in the Seine-et-Marne département (Île-de-France région).

Demographics

Composition 
At the French canton reorganisation which came into effect in March 2015, the canton was expanded from 15 to 81 communes:

Augers-en-Brie
Baby
Balloy
Bannost-Villegagnon
Bazoches-lès-Bray
Beauchery-Saint-Martin
Beton-Bazoches
Bezalles
Boisdon
Bray-sur-Seine
Cerneux
Cessoy-en-Montois
Chalautre-la-Grande
Chalautre-la-Petite
Chalmaison
Champcenest
La Chapelle-Saint-Sulpice
Châtenay-sur-Seine
Chenoise-Cucharmoy
Courchamp
Courtacon
Coutençon
Donnemarie-Dontilly
Égligny
Everly
Fontaine-Fourches
Frétoy
Gouaix
Gravon
Grisy-sur-Seine
Gurcy-le-Châtel
Hermé
Jaulnes
Jouy-le-Châtel
Jutigny
Léchelle
Lizines
Longueville
Louan-Villegruis-Fontaine
Luisetaines
Maison-Rouge
Les Marêts
Meigneux
Melz-sur-Seine
Mons-en-Montois
Montceaux-lès-Provins
Montigny-le-Guesdier
Montigny-Lencoup
Mortery
Mousseaux-lès-Bray
Mouy-sur-Seine
Noyen-sur-Seine
Les Ormes-sur-Voulzie
Paroy
Passy-sur-Seine
Poigny
Provins
Rouilly
Rupéreux
Saint-Brice 
Sainte-Colombe
Saint-Hilliers
Saint-Loup-de-Naud
Saint-Martin-du-Boschet
Saint-Sauveur-lès-Bray
Sancy-lès-Provins
Savins
Sigy
Sognolles-en-Montois
Soisy-Bouy
Vulaines-lès-Provins 
Sourdun
Thénisy
La Tombe
Villenauxe-la-Petite
Villeneuve-les-Bordes
Villiers-Saint-Georges
Villiers-sur-Seine
Villuis
Vimpelles
Voulton

See also
Cantons of the Seine-et-Marne department
Communes of the Seine-et-Marne department

References

Provins